Sidney Cross (7 July 1925 – 11 May 2010) was a British athlete. He competed in the men's triple jump at the 1948 Summer Olympics.

References

1925 births
2010 deaths
Athletes (track and field) at the 1948 Summer Olympics
British male triple jumpers
Olympic athletes of Great Britain
Sportspeople from Birmingham, West Midlands